Promestriene (brand names Colpotrofin, Colpotrophine, Delipoderm), also known as estradiol 3-propyl 17β-methyl diether, is a synthetic estrogen which is used topically in a 1% cream formulation for the treatment of vaginal atrophy in women. It is the 3-propyl and 17β-methyl diether of estradiol and does not appear to convert into estradiol in the body. Promestriene is minimally absorbed and appears to have negligible systemic estrogenic effect. The drug has been described as a tropic agent and antiseborrheic. It has not been found to be effective in the treatment of pattern hair loss or other conditions of cutaneous androgenization. Promestriene was first introduced in France in 1974 and has been marketed in 34 countries worldwide. It has been used in millions of women.

See also
 List of estrogen esters § Ethers of steroidal estrogens

References

Diols
Estranes
Estrogen ethers
Synthetic estrogens